Cronk is a surname.

List of people with the surname 

 Chas Cronk, English singer-songwriter and musician
 Cooper Cronk (born 1983), Australian rugby league footballer
 Coy Cronk (born 1998), American football player
 Edwin M. Cronk (1918–2020), the third United States Ambassador to Singapore
 George P. Cronk (1904–1996), Los Angeles City Councilman for the 5th district, 1945–52
 Hiram Cronk (1800–1905), the last surviving veteran of the War of 1812 at the time of his death
 Kylie Cronk (born 1984), softball player from Australia, who won a bronze medal at the 2008 Summer Olympics
 Mary Cronk MBE (1932–2018), an independent midwife from England awarded an MBE for services to midwifery
 Mike Cronk, American politician
 Rick Cronk (born 1942), American businessman, co-owner and president of Dreyer's Grand Ice Cream
 Toni Cronk (born 1980), field hockey goalkeeper from Australia

See also 

 Crank (surname)

Surnames